Ali Askar Lali is an Afghan former football player and trainer. In 1981, he moved to Germany as a refugee and lived many years in Paderborn. He now lives in Germany and Afghanistan. He is now the assistant manager of the Afghanistan national football team.

As a coach Lali currently participates in a project of the Foreign Office to promote Afghan women's football and trained the Afghan women's national team.

National career
He was included in the Afghanistan national under-20 football team at the 1977 AFC Youth Championship hosted by Iran. At senior level, he participated in 1976 Qaed-e Azam International Football Tournament hosted by Pakistan and [1980 Olympic Games qualifycation.

References 

Afghan footballers
Afghanistan international footballers
Living people
1957 births
Association football midfielders
Afghanistan national football team managers
Afghan football managers